NNS Ose (P186) is a small patrol boat operated by the Nigerian Navy.  She was commissioned in 2017, along with half a dozen sister ships.

Design

Operational career

On April 20, 2020, the Ose was sent to help rescue mariners aboard the container ship Tommi Ritscher, after it was boarded by pirates.   The liquid natural gas carrier was captured when moored off the coast of Benin.
The Tommi Ritscher had a crew of nineteen, eleven of whom were able to make it to a safe room.  Her Bulgarian Captain, three Russians, and a Ukrainian and three other crewmembers were taken hostage.

TASS reports that Benin patrol boats were able to drive off the hijacker's support boats.  They reported that Benin negotiators allowed the hijackers to leave the ship, taking their eight hostages with them.  They reported that three of the hostages were Russian citizens.

The Ose was dispatched after Benin called upon a memorandum of understanding between the two nations, and requested Nigerian assistance.  The Ose carried ten Nigerian Navy commandos to effect the boarding.

References

Ose
Ships built in France